Keg Creek is a stream in Mills, Pottawattamie, Harrison and Shelby  counties, in the U.S. state of Iowa.

Keg Creek was named from the fact bootleggers rolled barrels of whisky in the creek in order to hide them from liquor control agents.

See also
List of rivers of Iowa

References

Rivers of Harrison County, Iowa
Rivers of Mills County, Iowa
Rivers of Pottawattamie County, Iowa
Rivers of Shelby County, Iowa
Rivers of Iowa